Hayward Seaton Mack (March 20, 1882 – December 24, 1921) was an American actor of the silent era. 

Born in Albany, New York, in 1882, Mack appeared in more than 80 films between 1910 and 1921. Mack's motion picture career began in 1910; he appeared in films of many leading motion picture companies of the time.  He had also worked in vaudeville and in stage productions. Before embarking on an entertainment career Mack was a civil engineer and also worked as a newspaper man.

Mack died in Los Angeles, California, in 1921. Mack committed suicide in Los Angeles' Lafayette Park by taking poison.

Selected filmography

References

External links

1882 births
1921 deaths
1921 suicides
American male film actors
American male silent film actors
Male actors from New York (state)
Actors from Albany, New York
20th-century American male actors